The Corozel (also: Corazel) is a left tributary of the river Bârlad in Romania. It discharges into the Bârlad in Barcea.

References

Rivers of Romania
Rivers of Galați County